Bathypodocotyle is a genus of trematodes in the family Opecoelidae.

Species
Bathypodocotyle enkaimushi (Blend, Kuramochi & Dronen, 2015) Miller, Huston, Cutmore & Cribb, 2018
Bathypodocotyle margolisi (Gibson, 1995) Martin, Huston, Cutmore & Cribb, 2018

References

Opecoelidae
Plagiorchiida genera